Hannah Friedman is an American writer, producer, musician and director.

She is known for writing and producing roles in film and television, including projects with ABS, Amazon, CBS, Comedy Central, Conaco, Disney, DreamWorks, Hasbro, Imagine, Keshet, Lionsgate, NBC, Netflix, Pixar, Showtime, Titmouse, Universal TV, Warner Brothers and Wizards of the Coast. Her writing has also been featured in Newsweek and Cosmopolitan. Her memoir, Everything Sucks, was published in 2009.

Friedman has worked as a feature writer on the Pixar Braintrust and at Disney Feature Animation. She is the co-executive producer for Willow on Disney+, and a consulting producer/writer on Obi-Wan Kenobi for Lucasfilm, starring Ewan McGregor.

Articles and books

In 2004 Friedman's article When Your Friends Become The Enemy was published in Newsweek Magazine. It described the difficulties of the college application process. Friedman remains one of the youngest people to have been published in Newsweek.

Friedman's debut book, Everything Sucks, was a teen memoir released by HCI Books in August 2009. It recounts her adolescence being homeschooled on a tourbus, as well as her struggle to fit in at a boarding school on scholarship, leading to what the author describes as a story of "sex, drugs, and SATs".

Everything Sucks was reviewed on Salon.com, concluding, "Not only is Friedman's writing striking for its blunt, unromantic realism; her prose also displays a self-aware wit that is all too rare in the genre".

Performance

Friedman has made appearances on Comedy Central's This Is Not Happening, (2016) Don’t Tell My Mother! (2016), The Moth (2017), Netflix's Wet Hot American Summer: First Day Of Camp (2015) and Lake Bell’s I Do Until I Don’t (2017).

Musical career

Friedman is a musician and lyricist. She was a writer and co-composer with Benj Pasek, Mark Sonnenblick and Shaina Taub for StoryCourse's Saturday Night Seder.

Friedman wrote the script for My Silent Night, a musical, which premiered at the Salzburg State Theatre in 2018, a project with composer John Debney and songwriter Siedah Garrett.

In October 2009, Friedman was asked to perform at the 35th Anniversary Celebration of the National Coalition Against Censorship, a charity benefit gala hosted by Judy Blume. Friedman wrote and performed an original comedy song called Party Like It's 1984.

Friedman was an early adopter YouTuber using her account WritingHannah to share comedy songs and sketches.

Early life and education

Friedman was born in New York City. She is the elder of two children born to singer-songwriter Dean Friedman. Hannah's mother trained monkeys. While in this job, she adopted a capuchin monkey named Amelia, who has lived with the family for almost thirty years.

Friedman studied theater at Yale.

References

External links
 
 

Living people
American memoirists
American comedy writers
Jewish American writers
Jewish American musicians
Jewish American female comedians
1986 births
American women memoirists
American women television producers
American women television writers
21st-century American Jews
21st-century American women